St John's Lutheran Cemetery is a historic Lutheran cemetery on Upper Tug Fork Rd. near Alexandria, Kentucky.  It was added to the National Register of Historic Places in 1983.

It is the cemetery of the St. John's Lutheran Church, which was established in 1860 and served German Lutherans in both in its Campbell County, Kentucky area and in southern Ohio.

The cemetery was deemed "significant as a place of interment for local German Protestants. It also contains a unique instance of German funerary folk art."

References

External links
 

Cemeteries on the National Register of Historic Places in Kentucky
National Register of Historic Places in Campbell County, Kentucky
Lutheran cemeteries in the United States
1860 establishments in Kentucky
Buildings and structures completed in 1860
German-American culture in Kentucky
Lutheranism in Kentucky